Where We Started is the sixth studio album by American country music singer Thomas Rhett, released by Big Machine Records' Valory imprint on April 1, 2022. Rhett collaborated with Katy Perry, Riley Green, Tyler Hubbard and Russell Dickerson.

The album was preceded by its lead single "Slow Down Summer" which peaked at No. 43 on Billboard Hot 100. The album debuted at number 12 on US Billboard 200 with 29,000 album-equivalent units.

History
Thomas Rhett began writing songs for the album in 2019, but found out that he was experiencing writer's block. He told the blog Sounds Like Nashville that he took six months away from writing songs before coming back to continue the album's material. The album includes the lead single "Slow Down Summer", along with three collaborations. These are with Tyler Hubbard (of Florida Georgia Line) and Russell Dickerson on "Death Row", Riley Green on "Half of Me", and Katy Perry on the title track.

Critical reception
Stephen Thomas Erlewine of AllMusic rated the album 3.5 out of 5 stars, stating that it was "sunny and sweet, an ideal soundtrack for any afternoon activity from housecleaning to day drinking: it sustains its cheerful mood from stem to stern." He compared the title track to the sound of Sam Hunt, and criticized "Death Row" for its lyrics and Hubbard's vocals.

Commercial performance
In the United States, Where We Started debuted at number 12 on Billboard 200 with 29,000 equivalent album units sold in its first week. The album also opened at number two on Top Country Albums, becoming his sixth top 10 on the chart.

Track listing

Personnel

 Thomas Rhett – lead vocals, backing vocals (2–4, 7–9, 11–14), whistle (4, 8)
 Charlie Judge – acoustic piano (2, 3, 6, 7, 11, 12, 14), synthesizers (1, 8–10, 12, 13), Hammond B3 organ (2–7, 9, 10, 14, 15), Wurlitzer electric piano (4, 12), Rhodes piano (8, 14)
 Justin Niebank – programming (1–3, 6–15)
 Jesse Frasure – programming (1, 2, 6–15), electric guitar (2), synth bass (2, 7, 8, 11, 14, 15), acoustic piano (4), synthesizers (4, 15), backing vocals (4), synth strings (11, 13)
 David Huff – programming (2, 3, 5, 7–14)
 Matt Dragstrem – programming (3, 14), backing vocals (8, 14), acoustic piano (14), synthesizers (14), electric guitar (14)
 Luke Laird – programming (12), synthesizers (12), synth strings (12), synth bass (12)
 Ilya Toshinsky – acoustic guitars, gut string guitar (1), dobro (2, 3), ganjo (3), mandolin (3, 11), ukulele (4, 12), banjo (13)
 Derek Wells – electric guitar (1–4, 6, 8–15), slide electric guitar (7), electric guitar solo (14)
 Dann Huff – electric guitar (2, 4–8, 10–12), electric guitar solo (2–4, 6, 9, 10), mandolin (6, 11), synth flute (8), slide electric guitar (8, 11), sitar (8, 11, 12), programming (9, 10, 15), synth bass (10)
 Tom Bukovac – electric guitar (5)
 Julien Bunetta – acoustic guitar (5)
 Paul Franklin – steel guitar (1, 3, 5–11, 13, 15)
 Jimmie Lee Sloas – bass guitar 
 Shannon Forrest – drums (1, 6)
 Chris Kimmerer – drums (2–4, 7–14), percussion (4, 12, 15)
 Jerry Roe – drums (5)
 Stuart Duncan – fiddle (3)
 Kristin Wilkinson – string arrangements (1, 11–13, 15)
 Stephen Lamb – copyist (11, 12, 15)
 Kevin Bate – cello (1, 11–13, 15)
 Austin Hoke – cello (1, 13)
 Sari Reist – cello (11, 12, 15)
 Monisa Angell – viola (1, 11–13, 15)
 Betsy Lamb – viola (1, 13)
 Chris Farrell – viola (11, 12, 15)
 David Angell – violin (1, 11–13, 15), string contractor (11, 12, 15)
 Jenny Bifano – violin (1, 13)
 David Davidson – violin (1, 11–13, 15)
 Alicia Engstrom – violin (1, 13)
 Jun Iwasaki – violin (1, 11–13, 15)
 Karen Winklemann – violin (1, 13)
 Conni Ellisor – violin (11, 12, 15)
 Josh Reedy – backing vocals (1–4, 6–14)
 Stevie Frasure – backing vocals (2, 11, 13)
 Teddy Swims – backing vocals (5)
 Riley Green – featured vocals (6)
 Russell Dickerson – featured vocals (9)
 Tyler Hubbard – featured vocals (9)
 Katy Perry – featured vocals (15)
 Jon Bellion – backing vocals (15)

Charts

Weekly charts

Year-end charts

References

2022 albums
Big Machine Records albums
Thomas Rhett albums
Albums produced by Dann Huff